

Events

Pre-1600
AD 25 – Guangwu claims the throne as Emperor of China, restoring the Han dynasty after the collapse of the short-lived Xin dynasty.
70 – Fires resulting from the destruction of the Second Temple in Jerusalem are extinguished. 
135 – Roman armies enter Betar, slaughtering thousands and ending the Bar Kokhba revolt.
 642 – Battle of Maserfield: Penda of Mercia defeats and kills Oswald of Northumbria.
 910 – The last major Danish army to raid England for nearly a century is defeated at the Battle of Tettenhall by the allied forces of Mercia and Wessex, led by King Edward the Elder and Æthelred, Lord of the Mercians.
 939 – The Battle of Alhandic is fought between Ramiro II of León and Abd-ar-Rahman III at Zamora in the context of the Spanish Reconquista. The battle resulted in a victory for the Emirate of Córdoba.
1068 – Byzantine–Norman wars: Italo-Normans begin a nearly-three-year siege of Bari.
1100 – Henry I is crowned King of England in Westminster Abbey.
1278 – Spanish Reconquista: the forces of the Kingdom of Castile initiate the ultimately futile Siege of Algeciras against the Emirate of Granada.
1305 – First Scottish War of Independence: Sir John Stewart of Menteith, the pro-English Sheriff of Dumbarton, successfully manages to capture Sir William Wallace of Scotland, leading to Wallace's subsequent execution by hanging, evisceration, drawing and quartering, and beheading 18 days later.
1388 – The Battle of Otterburn, a border skirmish between the Scottish and the English in Northern England, is fought near Otterburn.
1506 – The Grand Duchy of Lithuania defeats the Crimean Khanate in the Battle of Kletsk.
1583 – Sir Humphrey Gilbert establishes the first English colony in North America, at what is now St. John's, Newfoundland and Labrador.
1600 – The Gowrie Conspiracy against King James VI of Scotland (later to become King James I of England) takes place.

1601–1900
1620 – The Mayflower departs from Southampton, England, carrying would-be settlers, on its first attempt to reach North America; it is forced to dock in Dartmouth when its companion ship, the Speedwell, springs a leak.
1689 – Beaver Wars: Fifteen hundred Iroquois attack Lachine in New France.
1716 – Austro-Turkish War (1716–1718): One-fifth of a Turkish army and the Grand Vizier are killed in the Battle of Petrovaradin.
1735 – Freedom of the press: New York Weekly Journal writer John Peter Zenger is acquitted of seditious libel against the royal governor of New York, on the basis that what he had published was true.
1772 – First Partition of Poland: The representatives of Austria, Prussia, and Russia sign three bilateral conventions condemning the ‘anarchy’ of the Polish-Lithuanian Commonwealth and imputing to the three powers ‘ancient and legitimate rights’ to the territories of the Commonwealth. The conventions allow each of the three great powers to annex a part of the Commonwealth, which they proceed to do over the course of the following two months.
1763 – Pontiac's War: Battle of Bushy Run: British forces led by Henry Bouquet defeat Chief Pontiac's Indians at Bushy Run.
1781 – The Battle of Dogger Bank takes place.
1796 – The Battle of Castiglione in Napoleon's first Italian campaigns of the French Revolutionary Wars.
1816 – The British Admiralty dismisses Francis Ronalds's new invention of the first working electric telegraph as "wholly unnecessary", preferring to continue using the semaphore.
1824 – Greek War of Independence: Konstantinos Kanaris leads a Greek fleet to victory against Ottoman and Egyptian naval forces in the Battle of Samos.
1858 – Cyrus West Field and others complete the first transatlantic telegraph cable after several unsuccessful attempts. It will operate for less than a month.
1860 – Charles XV of Sweden of Sweden-Norway is crowned king of Norway in Trondheim.
1861 – American Civil War: In order to help pay for the war effort, the United States government levies the first income tax as part of the Revenue Act of 1861 (3% of all incomes over US$800; rescinded in 1872).
  1861   – The United States Army abolishes flogging.
1862 – American Civil War: Battle of Baton Rouge: Along the Mississippi River near Baton Rouge, Louisiana, Confederate troops attempt to take the city, but are driven back by fire from Union gunboats.
1864 – American Civil War: The Battle of Mobile Bay begins at Mobile Bay near Mobile, Alabama, Admiral David Farragut leads a Union flotilla through Confederate defenses and seals one of the last major Southern ports.
1874 – Japan launches its postal savings system, modeled after a similar system in the United Kingdom.
1882 – Standard Oil Company of New Jersey, today known as ExxonMobil, is established officially. The company would later grow to become the holder of all Standard Oil companies and the entity at the center of the breakup of Standard Oil.
1884 – The cornerstone for the Statue of Liberty is laid on Bedloe's Island (now Liberty Island) in New York Harbor.
1888 – Bertha Benz drives from Mannheim to Pforzheim and back in the first long distance automobile trip, commemorated as the Bertha Benz Memorial Route since 2008.

1901–present
1906 – Persian Constitutional Revolution: Mozaffar ad-Din Shah Qajar, King of Iran, agrees to convert the government to a constitutional monarchy.
She is intercepted and sunk by the British light-cruiser .
  1914   – World War I: The guns of Point Nepean fort at Port Phillip Heads in Victoria (Australia) fire across the bows of the Norddeutscher Lloyd steamer  which is attempting to leave the Port of Melbourne in ignorance of the declaration of war and she is detained; this is said to be the first Allied shot of the War.
  1914   – In Cleveland, Ohio, the first electric traffic light is installed.
1916 – World War I: Battle of Romani: Allied forces, under the command of Archibald Murray, defeat an attacking Ottoman army under the command of Friedrich Freiherr Kress von Kressenstein, securing the Suez Canal and beginning the Ottoman retreat from the Sinai Peninsula.
1925 – Plaid Cymru is formed with the aim of disseminating knowledge of the Welsh language that is at the time in danger of dying out.
1926 – Harry Houdini performs his greatest feat, spending 91 minutes underwater in a sealed tank before escaping.
1940 – World War II: The Soviet Union formally annexes Latvia.
1944 – World War II: At least 1,104 Japanese POWs in Australia attempt to escape from a camp at Cowra, New South Wales; 545 temporarily succeed but are later either killed, commit suicide, or are recaptured.
  1944   – World War II: Polish insurgents liberate a German labor camp (Gęsiówka) in Warsaw, freeing 348 Jewish prisoners.
  1944   – World War II: The Nazis begin a week-long massacre of between 40,000 and 50,000 civilians and prisoners of war in Wola, Poland.
1949 – In Ecuador, an earthquake destroys 50 towns and kills more than 6,000.
1957 – American Bandstand, a show dedicated to the teenage "baby-boomers" by playing the songs and showing popular dances of the time, debuts on the ABC television network.
1960 – Burkina Faso, then known as Upper Volta, becomes independent from France.
1962 – Apartheid: Nelson Mandela is jailed. He would not be released until 1990.
  1962   – American actress Marilyn Monroe is found dead at her home from a drug overdose.
1963 – Cold War: The United States, the United Kingdom, and the Soviet Union sign the Partial Nuclear Test Ban Treaty.
1964 – Vietnam War: Operation Pierce Arrow: American aircraft from carriers  and  bomb North Vietnam in retaliation for strikes against U.S. destroyers in the Gulf of Tonkin.
1965 – The Indo-Pakistani War of 1965 begins as Pakistani soldiers cross the Line of Control dressed as locals.
1966 – A group of red guards at Experimental High in Beijing, including Deng Rong and Liu Pingping, daughters of Deng Xiaoping and Liu Shaoqi respectively, beat the deputy vice principal, Bian Zhongyun, to death with sticks after accusing her of counter-revolutionary revisionism, producing one of the first fatalities of the Cultural Revolution.
1969 – The Lonesome Cowboys police raid occurs in Atlanta, Georgia, leading to the creation of the Georgia Gay Liberation Front.
1971 – The first Pacific Islands Forum (then known as the "South Pacific Forum") is held in Wellington, New Zealand, with the aim of enhancing cooperation between the independent countries of the Pacific Ocean.
1973 – Mars 6 is launched from the USSR.
1974 – Vietnam War: The U.S. Congress places a $1 billion limit on military aid to South Vietnam.
  1974   – Watergate scandal: President Richard Nixon, under orders of the US Supreme Court, releases the "Smoking Gun" tape, recorded on June 23, 1972, clearly revealing his actions in covering up and interfering investigations into the break-in. His political support vanishes completely.
1979 – In Afghanistan, Maoists undertake the Bala Hissar uprising against the Leninist government.
1981 – President Ronald Reagan fires 11,359 striking air-traffic controllers who ignored his order for them to return to work.
1984 – A Biman Bangladesh Airlines Fokker F27 Friendship crashes on approach to Zia International Airport, in Dhaka, Bangladesh, killing all 49 people on board.
1995 – Yugoslav Wars: The city of Knin, Croatia, a significant Serb stronghold, is liberated by Croatian forces during Operation Storm. The date is celebrated in Croatia as Victory Day.
2003 – A car bomb explodes in the Indonesian capital of Jakarta outside the Marriott Hotel killing 12 and injuring 150.
  2010   – Ten members of International Assistance Mission Nuristan Eye Camp team are killed by persons unknown in Kuran wa Munjan District of Badakhshan Province, Afghanistan.
2012 – The Wisconsin Sikh temple shooting took place in Oak Creek, Wisconsin, killing six victims; the perpetrator committed suicide after being wounded by police.
2015 – The Environmental Protection Agency at Gold King Mine waste water spill releases three million gallons of heavy metal toxin tailings and waste water into the Animas River in Colorado.
2019 – The revocation of the special status of Jammu and Kashmir (state) occurred and the state was bifurcated into two union territories (Jammu and Kashmir (union territory) and Ladakh).
2020 – Prime Minister Narendra Modi attends the 'Bhoomi Pujan' or land worship ceremony and lays the foundation stone of Rama Mandir in Ayodhya after a Supreme Court verdict ruling in favour of building the temple on disputed land.
2021 – Australia's second most populous state Victoria enters its sixth COVID-19 lockdown, enacting stage four restrictions statewide in reaction to six new COVID-19 cases recorded that morning.

Births

Pre-1600
79 BC – Tullia, Roman daughter of Cicero (d. 45 BC)
1262 – Ladislaus IV of Hungary (d. 1290)
1301 – Edmund of Woodstock, 1st Earl of Kent, English politician, Lord Warden of the Cinque Ports (d. 1330)
1397 – Guillaume Dufay, Belgian-Italian composer and theorist (d. 1474)
1461 – Alexander Jagiellon, Polish king (d. 1506)
1540 – Joseph Justus Scaliger, French philologist and historian (d. 1609)

1601–1900
1607 – Antonio Barberini, Italian cardinal (d. 1671)
1623 – Antonio Cesti, Italian organist and composer (d. 1669)
1626 – Richard Ottley, English politician (d. 1670)
1662 – James Anderson, Scottish lawyer and historian (d. 1728)
1681 – Vitus Bering, Danish explorer (d. 1741)
1694 – Leonardo Leo, Italian composer (d. 1744)
1749 – Thomas Lynch Jr., American commander and politician (d. 1779)
1797 – Friedrich August Kummer, German cellist and composer (d. 1879)
1802 – Niels Henrik Abel, Norwegian mathematician and theorist (d. 1829)
1811 – Ambroise Thomas, French composer (d. 1896)
1813 – Ivar Aasen, Norwegian poet and linguist (d. 1896)
1815 – Edward John Eyre, English explorer and politician, Governor of Jamaica (d. 1901)
1827 – Deodoro da Fonseca, Brazilian field marshal and politician, 1st President of Brazil (d. 1892)
1828 – Louise of the Netherlands (d. 1871)
1833 – Carola of Vasa (d. 1907)
1843 – James Scott Skinner, Scottish violinist and composer (d. 1927)
1844 – Ilya Repin, Russian painter and sculptor (d. 1930)
1850 – Guy de Maupassant, French short story writer, novelist, and poet (d. 1893)
1860 – Louis Wain, English artist (d. 1939)
1862 – Joseph Merrick, English man with severe deformities (d. 1890)
1866 – Carl Harries, German chemist and academic (d. 1923)
  1866   – Harry Trott, Australian cricketer (d. 1917)
1868 – Oskar Merikanto, Finnish pianist and composer (d. 1924)
1872 – Oswaldo Cruz, Brazilian physician, bacteriologist, and epidemiologist, founded the Oswaldo Cruz Foundation (d. 1917)
1874 – Wesley Clair Mitchell, American economist and academic (d. 1948)
  1874   – Horace Rawlins, English golfer (d. 1935)
1876 – Mary Ritter Beard, American historian and activist (d. 1958)
1877 – Tom Thomson, Canadian painter (d. 1917)
1880 – Gertrude Rush, American lawyer and jurist (d. 1962)
  1880   – Ruth Sawyer, American author and educator (d. 1970)
1882 – Anne Acheson, Irish sculptor (d. 1962)
1887 – Reginald Owen, English-American actor and singer (d. 1972)
1889 – Conrad Aiken, American novelist, short story writer, critic, and poet (d. 1973)
1890 – Naum Gabo, Russian-American sculptor (d. 1977)
  1890   – Erich Kleiber, Austrian conductor and director (d. 1956)
1897 – Roberta Dodd Crawford, American soprano and educator (d. 1954)
  1897   – Aksel Larsen, Danish lawyer and politician (d. 1972)
1900 – Rudolf Schottlaender, German philosopher, classical philologist and translator (d. 1988)

1901–present
1901 – Claude Autant-Lara, French director, screenwriter, and politician (d. 2000)
1904 – Kenneth V. Thimann, English-American botanist and microbiologist (d. 1997)
1906 – Joan Hickson, English actress (d. 1998)
  1906   – John Huston, American actor, director, and screenwriter (d. 1987)
  1906   – Wassily Leontief, German-American economist and academic, Nobel Prize laureate (d. 1999)
1908 – Harold Holt, Australian lawyer and politician, 17th Prime Minister of Australia (d. 1967)
  1908   – Jose Garcia Villa, Filipino short story writer and poet (d. 1997)
1910 – Bruno Coquatrix, French songwriter and manager (d. 1979)
  1910   – Herminio Masantonio, Argentinian footballer (d. 1956)
1911 – Robert Taylor, American actor and singer (d. 1969)
1912 – Abbé Pierre, French priest and humanitarian (d. 2007)
1914 – Parley Baer, American actor (d. 2002)
1916 – Peter Viereck, American poet and academic (d. 2006)
1918 – Tom Drake, American actor and singer (d. 1982)
  1918   – Betty Oliphant, English-Canadian ballerina, co-founded Canada's National Ballet School (d. 2004)
1919 – Rosalind Hicks, British literary guardian and the only child of author, Agatha Christie (d. 2004)
1920 – George Tooker, American painter and academic (d. 2011)
1921 – Terry Becker, American actor, director, and producer (d. 2014)
1922 – L. Tom Perry, American businessman and religious leader (d. 2015)
  1922   – Frank Stranahan, American golfer (d. 2013)
1923 – Devan Nair, Malaysian-Singaporean union leader and politician, 3rd President of Singapore (d. 2005)
1926 – Betsy Jolas, French composer
  1926   – Jeri Southern, American jazz singer and pianist (d. 1991)
1927 – John H. Moore II, American lawyer and judge (d. 2013)
1929 – Don Matheson, American soldier, police officer, and actor (d. 2014)
1930 – Neil Armstrong, American pilot, engineer, and astronaut (d. 2012)
  1930   – Damita Jo DeBlanc, American comedian, actress, and singer (d. 1998)  
  1930   – Richie Ginther, American race car driver (d. 1989)
  1930   – Michal Kováč, Slovak lawyer and politician, 1st President of Slovakia (d.2016)
1931 – Tom Hafey, Australian footballer and coach (d. 2014)
1932 – Tera de Marez Oyens, Dutch pianist and composer (d. 1996)
  1932   – Vladimir Fedoseyev, Russian conductor
1934 – Karl Johan Åström, Swedish engineer and theorist
  1934   – Wendell Berry, American novelist, short story writer, poet, and essayist
  1934   – Gay Byrne, Irish radio and television host (d. 2019)
1935 – Michael Ballhaus, German director and cinematographer (d. 2017)
  1935   – Peter Inge, Baron Inge, English field marshal (d. 2022)
  1935   – Roy Benavidez, American Master Sergeant and Medal of Honor Winner (d. 1998)
1936 – Nikolai Baturin, Estonian author and playwright (d. 2019)
  1936   – John Saxon, American actor (d. 2020)
1937 – Herb Brooks, American ice hockey player and coach (d. 2003)
  1937   – Brian G. Marsden, English-American astronomer and academic (d. 2010)
1939 – Roger Clark, English race car driver (d. 1998)
  1939   – Carmen Salinas, Mexican actress and politician (d. 2021)
1940 – Bobby Braddock, American country music songwriter, musician, and producer 
  1940   – Roman Gabriel, American football player, coach, and actor
  1940   – Rick Huxley, English bass player (d. 2013)
1941 – Bob Clark, American director, producer, and screenwriter (d. 2007)
  1941   – Leonid Kizim, Ukrainian general, pilot, and astronaut (d. 2010)
  1941   – Airto Moreira, Brazilian-American drummer and composer
1942 – Joe Boyd, American record producer, founded Hannibal Records
1943 – Nelson Briles, American baseball player (d. 2005)
  1943   – Sammi Smith, American country music singer-songwriter (d. 2005)
1944 – Christopher Gunning, English composer
1945 – Loni Anderson, American actress
1946 – Bruce Coslet, American football player and coach
  1946   – Shirley Ann Jackson, American physicist
  1946   – Rick van der Linden, Dutch keyboard player and songwriter (d. 2006)
  1946   – Bob McCarthy, Australian rugby league player and coach
  1946   – Erika Slezak, American actress
  1946   – Xavier Trias, Spanish pediatrician and politician, 118th Mayor of Barcelona
1947 – Angry Anderson, Australian singer and actor
  1947   – Bernie Carbo, American baseball player 
  1947   – France A. Córdova, American astrophysicist and academic
  1947   – Rick Derringer, American singer-songwriter, guitarist, and producer
  1947   – Greg Leskiw, Canadian guitarist and songwriter 
1948 – Ray Clemence, English footballer and manager (d. 2020)
  1948   – Barbara Flynn, English actress
  1948   – David Hungate, American bass guitarist, producer, and arranger
  1948   – Shin Takamatsu, Japanese architect and academic
1950 – Luiz Gushiken, Brazilian trade union leader and politician (d. 2013)
  1950   – Mahendra Karma, Indian lawyer and politician (d. 2013)
1951 – Samantha Sang, Australian pop singer
1952 – Tamás Faragó, Hungarian water polo player
  1952   – John Jarratt, Australian actor and producer
  1952   – Louis Walsh, Irish talent manager
1953 – Rick Mahler, American baseball player and coach (d. 2005)
1955 – Eddie Ojeda, American guitarist and songwriter 
1956 – Christopher Chessun, English Anglican bishop
  1956   – Jerry Ciccoritti, Canadian actor, director, producer, and screenwriter
1957 – Larry Corowa, Australian rugby league player
  1957   – David Gill, English businessman
  1957   – Faith Prince, American actress and singer
1959 – Pete Burns, English singer-songwriter (d. 2016)
  1959   – Pat Smear, American guitarist and songwriter 
1960 – David Baldacci, American lawyer and author
1961 – Janet McTeer, English actress
  1961   – Athula Samarasekera, Sri Lankan cricketer and coach
  1961   – Tim Wilson, American comedian, singer-songwriter, and guitarist (d. 2014)
1962 – Patrick Ewing, Jamaican-American basketball player and coach
  1962   – Otis Thorpe, American basketball player
1963 – Steve Lee, Swiss singer-songwriter (d. 2010)
  1963   – Ingmar De Vos, Belgian sports administrator
1964 – Rory Morrison, English journalist (d. 2013)
  1964   – Adam Yauch, American rapper and director (d. 2012)
1965 – Jeff Coffin, American saxophonist and composer 
  1965   – Motoi Sakuraba, Japanese keyboard player and composer
1966 – Jennifer Finch, American singer, bass player, and photographer 
  1966   – Jonathan Silverman, American actor and producer
1967 – Matthew Caws, American singer-songwriter and guitarist
1968 – Terri Clark, Canadian singer-songwriter and guitarist
  1968   – Kendo Kashin, Japanese wrestler and mixed martial artist
  1968   – Marine Le Pen, French lawyer and politician
  1968   – Oleh Luzhnyi, Ukrainian footballer and manager
  1968   – Colin McRae, Scottish race car driver (d. 2007)
  1968   – John Olerud, American baseball player
1969 – Jackie Doyle-Price, English politician
  1969   – Vasbert Drakes, Barbadian cricketer
  1969   – Venkatesh Prasad, Indian cricketer and coach
  1969   – Rob Scott, Australian rower
1970 – James Gunn, American actor, director, producer, and screenwriter
1971 – Valdis Dombrovskis, Latvian academic and politician, 11th Prime Minister of Latvia
1972 – Ikuto Hidaka, Japanese wrestler
  1972   – Aaqib Javed, Pakistani cricketer and coach
  1972   – Darren Shahlavi, English-American actor and martial artist (d. 2015)
  1972   – Jon Sleightholme, English rugby player
  1972   – Theodore Whitmore, Jamaican footballer and manager
  1972   – Christian Olde Wolbers, Belgian-American guitarist, songwriter, and producer 
1973 – Paul Carige, Australian rugby league player
  1973   – Justin Marshall, New Zealand rugby player and sportscaster
1974 – Alvin Ceccoli, Australian footballer
  1974   – Kajol, Indian film actress
  1974   – Olle Kullinger, Swedish footballer
  1974   – Antoine Sibierski, French footballer
1975 – Dan Hipgrave, English guitarist and journalist 
  1975   – Josep Jufré, Spanish cyclist 
  1975   – Eicca Toppinen, Finnish cellist and composer 
1976 – Jeff Friesen, Canadian ice hockey player
  1976   – Marians Pahars, Latvian footballer and manager
  1976   – Eugen Trică, Romanian footballer and manager
1977 – Eric Hinske, American baseball player and coach
  1977   – Mark Mulder, American baseball player and sportscaster
  1977   – Michael Walsh, English footballer
1978 – Cosmin Bărcăuan, Romanian footballer and manager
  1978   – Kim Gevaert, Belgian sprinter
  1978   – Harel Levy, Israeli tennis player
1979 – David Healy, Irish footballer
1980 – Wayne Bridge, English footballer
  1980   – Salvador Cabañas, Paraguayan footballer
  1980   – Jason Culina, Australian footballer
  1980   – Jesse Williams, American actor, director, producer, and political activist
1981 – David Clarke, English ice hockey player
  1981   – Carl Crawford, American baseball player
  1981   – Maik Franz, German footballer
  1981   – Erik Guay, Canadian skier
  1981   – Travie McCoy, American rapper, singer, and songwriter
  1981   – Anna Rawson, Australian golfer
  1981   – Rachel Scott, American murder victim, inspired the Rachel's Challenge (d. 1999)
1982 – Jamie Houston, English-German rugby player
  1982   – Lolo Jones, American hurdler
  1982   – Michele Pazienza, Italian footballer
  1982   – Tobias Regner, German singer-songwriter
  1982   – Jeff Robson, Australian rugby league player
  1982   – Pete Sell, American mixed martial artist
1984 – Steve Matai, New Zealand rugby league player
  1984   – Helene Fischer, German singer-songwriter
1985 – Laurent Ciman, Belgian footballer
  1985   – Salomon Kalou, Ivorian footballer
  1985   – Gil Vermouth, Israeli footballer
  1985   – Erkan Zengin, Swedish footballer
1986 – Paula Creamer, American golfer
  1986   – Kathrin Zettel, Austrian skier
1987 – Genelia D'Souza, Indian actress
1988 – Michael Jamieson, Scottish-English swimmer
  1988   – Federica Pellegrini, Italian swimmer
1989 – Ryan Bertrand, English footballer
  1989   – Mathieu Manset, French footballer
  1989   – Jessica Nigri, American model and actress
1991 – Esteban Gutiérrez, Mexican race car driver
  1991   – Konrad Hurrell, Tongan rugby league player
  1991 – Daniëlle van de Donk, Dutch footballer
  1991   – Andreas Weimann, Austrian footballer
1995 – Pierre-Emile Højbjerg, Danish footballer
1996 – Takakeishō Mitsunobu, Japanese sumo wrestler
  1996   – Cho Seung-youn, South Korean singer-songwriter and rapper
1997 – Jack Cogger, Australian rugby league player
  1997   – Olivia Holt, American actress and singer
  1997   – Wang Yibo, Chinese dancer, singer and actor
1998 – Adam Doueihi, Australian-Lebanese rugby league player
  1998   – Mimi Keene, English actress
  1998   – Kanon Suzuki, Japanese singer and actress
2001 – Anthony Edwards, American basketball player
2000 – Tom Gilbert, Australian rugby league player 
2003 – Toni Shaw, British Paralympic swimmer
2004 – Gavi, Spanish Footballer

Deaths

Pre-1600
 553 – Xiao Ji, prince of the Liang dynasty (b. 508)
 642 – Eowa, king of Mercia
   642   – Oswald, king of Northumbria (b. 604)
 824 – Heizei, Japanese emperor (b. 773)
 877 – Ubayd Allah ibn Yahya ibn Khaqan, Abbasid vizier 
 882 – Louis III, Frankish king (b. 863)
 890 – Ranulf II, duke of Aquitaine (b. 850)
 910 – Eowils and Halfdan, joint kings of Northumbria
   910   – Ingwær, king of Northumbria
 917 – Euthymius I of Constantinople (b. 834)
 940 – Li Decheng, Chinese general (b. 863)
1063 – Gruffydd ap Llywelyn, King of Gwynedd
1364 – Kōgon, Japanese emperor (b. 1313)
1415 – Richard of Conisburgh, 3rd Earl of Cambridge (b. 1375)
  1415   – Henry Scrope, 3rd Baron Scrope of Masham (b. 1370)
1447 – John Holland, 2nd Duke of Exeter (b. 1395)
1579 – Stanislaus Hosius, Polish cardinal (b. 1504)
1600 – John Ruthven, 3rd Earl of Gowrie, Scottish conspirator (b. 1577)

1601–1900
1610 – Alonso García de Ramón, Spanish soldier and politician, Royal Governor of Chile (b. 1552)
1633 – George Abbot, English archbishop and academic (b. 1562)
1678 – Juan García de Zéspedes, Mexican tenor and composer (b. 1619)
1729 – Thomas Newcomen, English engineer, invented the eponymous Newcomen atmospheric engine (b. 1664)
1743 – John Hervey, 2nd Baron Hervey, English courtier and politician, Vice-Chamberlain of the Household (b. 1696)
1778 – Charles Clémencet, French historian and author (b. 1703)
  1778   – Thomas Linley the younger, English composer (b. 1756)
1792 – Frederick North, Lord North, English politician, Prime Minister of the United Kingdom (b. 1732)
1799 – Richard Howe, 1st Earl Howe, English admiral and politician (b. 1726)
1868 – Jacques Boucher de Crèvecœur de Perthes, French archaeologist and historian (b. 1788)
1877 – Robert Williams (known as Trebor Mai), Welsh poet (b. 1830)
1880 – Ferdinand Ritter von Hebra, Austrian physician and dermatologist (b. 1816)
1881 – Spotted Tail, American tribal chief (b. 1823)
1895 – Friedrich Engels, German philosopher (b. 1820)

1901–present
1901 – Victoria, Princess Royal of the United Kingdom and German Empress (b. 1840)
1904 – George Dibbs, Australian politician, 10th Premier of New South Wales (b. 1834)
1911 – Bob Caruthers, American baseball player and umpire (b. 1864)
1916 – George Butterworth, British composer, killed at the Battle of the Somme (b. 1885)
1921 – Dimitrios Rallis, Greek lawyer and politician, 78th Prime Minister of Greece (b. 1844)
1929 – Millicent Fawcett, English trade union leader and activist (b. 1847)
1933 – Charles Harold Davis, American painter and academic (b. 1856)
1935 – David Townsend, American art director and set designer (b. 1891)
1939 – Béla Jankovich, Hungarian economist and politician, Minister of Education of Hungary (b. 1865)
1944 – Maurice Turnbull, Welsh cricketer and rugby player (b. 1906)
1946 – Wilhelm Marx, German lawyer and politician, 17th Chancellor of Germany (b. 1863)
1948 – Montagu Toller, English cricketer and lawyer (b. 1871)
1952 – Sameera Moussa, Egyptian physicist and academic (b. 1917)
1955 – Carmen Miranda, Portuguese-Brazilian actress and singer (b. 1909)
1957 – Heinrich Otto Wieland, German chemist and academic, Nobel Prize laureate (b. 1877)
1959 – Edgar Guest, English-American journalist and poet (b. 1881)
1960 – Arthur Meighen, Canadian lawyer and politician, 9th Prime Minister of Canada (b. 1874)
1963 – Salvador Bacarisse, Spanish composer (b. 1898)
1964 – Moa Martinson, Swedish author (b. 1890)
  1964   – Art Ross, Canadian-American ice hockey player and coach (b. 1886)
1968 – Luther Perkins, American guitarist (b. 1928)
1978 – Jesse Haines, American baseball player and coach (b. 1893)
1980 – Harold L. Runnels, American soldier and politician (b. 1924)
1983 – Judy Canova, American actress and comedian (b. 1913)
  1983   – Joan Robinson, English economist and author (b. 1903)
1984 – Richard Burton, Welsh-Swiss actor and producer (b. 1925)
1985 – Arnold Horween, American football player and coach (b. 1898)
1987 – Georg Gaßmann, German politician, Mayor of Marburg (b. 1910)
1991 – Paul Brown, American football player and coach (b. 1908)
  1991   – Soichiro Honda, Japanese engineer and businessman, founded Honda (b. 1906)
1992 – Robert Muldoon, New Zealand politician, 31st Prime Minister of New Zealand (b. 1921)
1994 – Menachem Avidom, Israeli composer (b. 1908)
  1994   – Alain de Changy, Belgian race car driver (b. 1922)
1998 – Otto Kretschmer, German commander (b. 1912)
  1998   – Todor Zhivkov, Bulgarian commander and politician, 36th Prime Minister of Bulgaria (b. 1911)
2000 – Otto Buchsbaum, Austrian-Brazilian journalist and activist (b. 1920)
  2000   – Tullio Crali, Montenegrin-Italian pilot and painter (b. 1910)
  2000   – Lala Amarnath, Indian cricketer who scored India's first Test century (b. 1911)
  2000   – Alec Guinness, English actor (b. 1914)
2001 – Otema Allimadi, Ugandan politician, 2nd Prime Minister of Uganda (b. 1929)
  2001   – Christopher Skase, Australian-Spanish businessman (b. 1948)
2002 – Josh Ryan Evans, American actor (b. 1982)
  2002   – Chick Hearn, American sportscaster (b. 1916)
  2002   – Franco Lucentini, Italian journalist and author (b. 1920)
  2002   – Darrell Porter, American baseball player (b. 1952)
  2002   – Matt Robinson, American actor, producer, and screenwriter (b. 1937)
2005 – Polina Astakhova, Russian gymnast and coach (b. 1936)
  2005   – Jim O'Hora, American football player and coach (b. 1915)
  2005   – Raul Roco, Filipino lawyer and politician, 31st Filipino Secretary of Education (b. 1941)
  2005   – Eddie Jenkins, Welsh footballer (b. 1909)
2007 – Jean-Marie Lustiger, French cardinal (b. 1926)
  2007   – Florian Pittiș, Romanian actor, singer, director, and producer (b. 1943)
2008 – Neil Bartlett, English-American chemist and academic (b. 1932)
  2008   – Reg Lindsay, Australian singer-songwriter, guitarist, and producer (b. 1929)
2009 – Budd Schulberg, American author, screenwriter, and producer (b. 1914)
2011 – Andrzej Lepper, Polish farmer and politician, Deputy Prime Minister of Poland (b. 1954)
  2011   – Aziz Shavershian, Russian-born Australian Bodybuilder and internet sensation (b. 1989)
2012 – Erwin Axer, Polish director and screenwriter (b. 1917)
  2012   – Michel Daerden, Belgian lawyer and politician (b. 1949)
  2012   – Fred Matua, American football player (b. 1984)
  2012   – Martin E. Segal, Russian-American businessman, co-founded Film Society of Lincoln Center (b. 1916)
  2012   – Chavela Vargas, Costa Rican-Mexican singer-songwriter and actress (b. 1919)
  2012   – Roland Charles Wagner, French author and translator (b. 1960)
2013 – Ruth Asawa, American sculptor and educator (b. 1926)
  2013   – Shawn Burr, Canadian-American ice hockey player (b. 1966)
  2013   – Willie Dunn, Canadian singer-songwriter and producer (b. 1942)
  2013   – Roy Rubin, American basketball player and coach (b. 1925)
  2013   – May Song Vang, American activist (b. 1951)
  2013   – Rob Wyda, American commander and judge (b. 1959)
2014 – Harold J. Greene, American general (b. 1962)
  2014   – Vladimir Orlov, Russian author (b. 1936)
  2014   – Chapman Pincher, Indian-English historian, journalist, and author (b. 1914)
  2014   – Jesse Leonard Steinfeld, American physician and academic, 11th Surgeon General of the United States (b. 1927)
2015 – Arthur Walter James, English journalist and politician (b. 1912)
  2015   – Tony Millington, Welsh footballer (b. 1943)
2018 – Alan Rabinowitz, American zoologist (b. 1953)
2019 – Toni Morrison, American author, Pulitzer Prize winner, and Nobel laureate (b. 1931).
2020 – Hawa Abdi, Somali human rights activist and physician (b. 1947)
2022 – Judith Durham, Australian singer-songwriter (b. 1943)
  2022   – Cherie Gil, Filipino actress (b. 1963)
  2022   – Ali Haydar, Syrian army officer (b. 1932)
  2022   – Issey Miyake, Japanese fashion designer (b. 1938)
  2022   – Dillon Quirke, Irish hurler (b. 1998)

Holidays and observances
 Christian feast day:
 Abel of Reims
 Addai
 Afra
 Albrecht Dürer, Matthias Grünewald, and Lucas Cranach the Elder (Episcopal Church (USA))
 Cassian of Autun
 Dedication of the Basilica of St Mary Major (Catholic Church)
 Emygdius
 Memnius
 Oswald of Northumbria
 August 5 (Eastern Orthodox liturgics)
 Independence Day (Burkina Faso)
 Victory and Homeland Thanksgiving Day and the Day of Croatian defenders (Croatia)

References

External links

 
 
 

Days of the year
August